Roseland is a 1977 Merchant Ivory Productions' anthology film with a screenplay by Ruth Prawer Jhabvala. It was directed by James Ivory and produced by Ismail Merchant.

The film is made up of three connected short features: The Waltz, The Hustle and The Peabody. All three stories share a theme of the protagonists trying to find the right dance partner, and all are set in the Roseland Ballroom in New York City.

Plot
At Roseland, an older lady, May (Wright), with a light step, looks for the memory of her husband in the ballroom's mirrors. Stan (Jacobi), a cheerful older man steers May to brandy alexanders and away from her past.

Pauline (Copeland) is a middle-aged widow with the means to pay for the services of a younger gigolo, Russell (Walken) and share champagne with her Roseland friends, the dance teacher Cleo (Helen Gallagher) and the shy divorcee, Marilyn (Chaplin). Both Marilyn and Cleo fail to break Russell's attachment to the lifestyle that Pauline provides.

Rosa (Skala), a former Schrafft's cook and aspiring dance superstar makes it her mission to win the peabody prize with her older partner, Arthur (Thomas) who is desperate to marry her.

Cast

The Waltz
Teresa Wright (May),
Lou Jacobi (Stan),
Don De Natale (Master of Ceremonies),
Louise Kirkland (Ruby),
Hetty Galen (Red-Haired Lady),
Carol Culver (Young May),
Denny Shearer (Eddie)

The Hustle
Geraldine Chaplin (Marilyn),
Helen Gallagher (Cleo),
Joan Copeland (Pauline),
Christopher Walken (Russell),
Conrad Janis (George),
Jayne Heller (Bella),
Annette Rivera and Floyd Chisolm (Hustle Couple),
Jeanmarie Evans (Cloakroom Attendant)

The Peabody
Lilia Skala (Rosa)
David Thomas (Arthur)
Edward Kogan (Bartender)
Madeline Lee (Camille)
Stan Rubin (Bert)
Dortha Duckworth (Ladies' Room Attendant)

Crew
Director: James Ivory
Producer: Ismail Merchant
Screenplay: Ruth Prawer Jhabvala
Photography: Ernest Vincze
Music: Michael Gibson
Dance director: Patricia Birch
Associate producers: Dennis J. Murphy, Macy Wall
Executive producers: Michael T. Murphy, Ottomar Rudolf
Casting: Judy Abbott 
Film editors: Humphrey Dixon, Richard Schmiechen

Production

Filming
Roseland was filmed in an almost pseudo-documentary style as an exploration of the lives of Roseland's customers. The vignettes are also purportedly based on true stories. Filming took place almost entirely in the Roseland Ballroom.

Reception 
The Washington Post explained that the film shows what "is mostly the sadness and faded dreams of dancers who look like they were around the day the doors first opened." The review praised how Ivory "effectively uses three romantic vignettes" as well as the "realistic" dialogue. John Simon called Roseland a piece of vulgar and inept filmmaking.

References

External links
Merchant Ivory
 

1977 films
American anthology films
Merchant Ivory Productions films
Films directed by James Ivory
Films with screenplays by Ruth Prawer Jhabvala
1970s English-language films